Prem Nawas (born Abdul Wahab) was an Indian actor and producer in Malayalam cinema, and the younger brother of Malayalam cinema actor Prem Nazir. His parents were Shahul Hameed and Asmabeevi. He lost his mother at a very young age, and his father remarried. He moved to Madras, before his brother, in search of a film career. He debuted as the hero of Koodapirappu in 1956. He was the hero in the first colour film made in Malayalam, Kandam Becha Kottu. He also played an important role in the blockbuster 1974 film Nellu, directed by Ramu Kariyattu. When he found he could not succeed as well as his brother as an actor, he turned to producing films. He produced the award-winning blockbuster Agniputhri (1967), starring his brother and Sheela, the evergreen pair of Malayalam cinema. His son Prem Kishore was an actor as well, and appeared in two Malayalam films, Vacation and Thaskara Puthran.

Prem Nawas died in a train accident in Madras on March 27, 1992, at age 60.

Filmography

As an actor

As a producer
 Agniputhri (1967)
 Neethi (1971)
 Thulaavarsham (1976)
 Poojakkedukkaatha Pookkal (1977)
 Keni (1982)

References

 http://www.malayalachalachithram.com/profiles.php?i=2775
 http://imprintsonindianfilmscreen.blogspot.com.au/2012/04/prem-nawas.html

External links

 Prem Nawas at MSI

Indian male film actors
Male actors from Thiruvananthapuram
Male actors in Malayalam cinema
1932 births
1992 deaths
Railway accident deaths in India
20th-century Indian male actors
Malayalam film producers
Film producers from Kerala